Olenev (from олень meaning deer) is a Russian masculine surname, its feminine counterpart is Oleneva. Notable people with the surname include:

Konstantin Olenev (born 1961), Russian football coach and former player
Tatiana Mishina (née Oleneva in 1954), Russian figure skating coach and former competitor

Russian-language surnames